Augustine Miles Kelechi (born 17 December 1992), popularly known as Tekno , is a Nigerian singer and songwriter and Record producer.

Background and early life
Kelechi is from Ivo Local Government Area, Ebonyi State,Nigeria. He was born in Bauchi State into a family of six — five boys and one girl.  He was raised in several parts of the country including Nassarawa, Kaduna and Abuja due to the fact that his father was a member of the Nigerian Army. At the age of 8, Tekno Miles was enrolled in a music school where he learned and mastered the rudiments of playing the piano and guitar. He is the elder brother to another Nigerian musical act, Spotless.

Musical career
Tekno Miles was first signed under K-Money Entertainment. His breakout single titled "Holiday", was released under the imprint. With featured vocals from Davido, "Holiday" was positively accepted and gained massive airplay.

In 2012, Tekno Miles was spotted by renowned Nigerian comedian Julius Agwu at an event in Abuja, after Tekno Miles received a standing ovation following the performance of a song titled "Onye Ne Kwu", his remix of Ice Prince's "Oleku". It was at the same event he met Iyanya and Ubi Franklin, the manager of Made Men Music Group and they became friends. Ubi and Iyanya eventually encouraged Tekno Miles to move to Lagos to further his music career.

On 5 October 2013, he signed a recording contract with Made Men Music Group (MMMG), under which he released singles like "Dance" and "Anything". These singles earned him a nomination in the "Best New act of the Year" category at the 2014 Nigeria Entertainment Awards. On 18 June 2015, Tekno Miles released his hit single titled "Duro", which was produced by DJ Coublon. "Duro" was positively received both in Africa and in the US. A remix which featured Phyno and Flavour N'abania was released on 16 November 2015. It topped several charts in Nigeria and on the international scene, it peaked at number 5 on Capital XTRA's Afrobeats Chart: Top 10 for September 2015. On 20 November 2015, Tekno Miles released a single titled "Wash". The song was produced by DJ Coublon with the video directed by AJE Filmworks. On 27 December 2016, Tekno was named one of the top ten hip-hop and R&B talents to watch in the United States in 2017 by Billboard.

In 2016, Elton John played Tekno song titled 'Diana' on one of his episode of Rocket Hour radio show on Apple Music.

However, On 13 October 2017, Tekno was featured by DJ Cuppy on a song titled Green Light, which was officially DJ Cuppy's first single.

On 12 December 2017, American rapper Drake posted images of himself with Tekno to his Instagram page, captioning them, "Tekkk time."

On 22 July 2022, Kizz Daniel and Tekno expresses dissatisfaction after Google named ‘Buga’ No 1 song in Nigeria.

On 10 August 2018,American singer Ciara, has teamed up with Tekno, for a collaboration titled "Freak Me."Tekno announced the song's release and revealed the cover art on his Instagram account @teknoofficial on Friday.

On 15 August 2019,Tekno was announced as one of the producers of ‘Won’t Be Late’ by Swae Lee featuring Drake

In June 2018, Tekno signed a distribution deal with Universal Music Group Nigeria (UMGN), a division of Universal Music Group in charge of West Africa, as well as the UK-based Island Records. In July 2019, Tekno was featured on Beyoncé's The Lion King: The Gift soundtrack on the song "Don't Jealous Me".

In 6 December 2020, Tekno released the tracklist for his long-awaited debut album, Old Romance. In 2022, he featured in Kizz Daniel's 'Buga', a track that became the No. 1 shazamed tune within the same year. Also, within the same year, Davido revealed how Tekno had assisted in reviving his career at a very crucial moment when he needed fresh inspiration.

Afro-pop singer Tekno has released the music video for his latest single "Puttin".

Discography

Albums

 Old Romance (2020)

Singles

Records produced

Awards and nominations

Personal life

In May 2018, Tekno welcomed a baby girl with girlfriend Lola Rae.

In 2020, Tekno announced that he has relocated to the United States till further. This was a reaction to the news of the proposal presented at the Nigerian National Assembly for the change of the country's name to UAR, which was an acronym for United African Republic or United Alkebulan Republic on 2 June.

In 2017, Tekno made it known to the public that he has acid reflux. The condition had gotten complicated and had ultimately affected his vocal cords. He had to undergo surgery to tackle the issue.

See also
List of Igbo people
List of Nigerian musicians

References 
 

1990 births
Living people
Igbo people
Nigerian hip hop musicians
21st-century Nigerian male singers
Nigerian male singer-songwriters
People from Ebonyi State
Igbo singers
Nigerian record producers